Sharda Sinha (born 1 October 1952) is an Indian folk and classical singer. Sharda Sinha is a popular Maithili and Bhojpuri singer from Mithila. She is a famous traditional female singer for 'Maithili' and Bhojpuri songs. She has sung many regional songs like "Vivah Geet", "Chhath Geet". In 1991, she received the Padma Shri award for her contribution to music. She was awarded Padma Bhushan, India's third highest civilian award, on the eve of Republic Day in 2018.

Background
Sinha was born in Hulas, Supaul district of Bihar. Her in-laws home is in Sihama village in Begusarai district. She started her career by singing Maithili folk songs. Sinha sings in Bhojpuri, Maithili, Magahi and Hindi. Prayag Sangeet Samiti organised Basant Mahotsava at Allahabad where Sinha presented numerous songs based on the theme of spring season, where the advent of spring was narrated through folk songs. She regularly performs during Chhath Puja festivities. She performed when the Prime Minister of Mauritius Navin Ramgoolam came to Bihar.

Sinha performed at Pragati Maidan in the Bihar Utsav, 2010, New Delhi.

Sinha also sang the song "Kahe Toh Se Sajna" in the hit movie Maine Pyar Kia (1989), "Taar Bijli" from Bollywood film Gangs of Wasseypur Part 2 and "Kaun Si Nagaria" from Bollywood film Chaarfutiya Chhokare.

Sharda Sinha and Chhath
Sharda Sinha, a folk singer synonymous with Chhath, has come out with two new songs on Chhath after a decade in 2016. Her last album of devotional songs was released in 2006.

In the songs - with lyrics like Supawo Naa Mile Maai and Pahile Pahil Chhathi Maiya - Sharda is urging people to come to Bihar during Chhath. Other Chhath songs played during the festival include Kelwa Ke Paat Par Ugalan Suraj Mal Jhake Jhuke, Hey Chhathi Maiya, Ho Dinanath, Bahangi Lachakat Jaaye, Roje Roje Ugelaa, Suna Chhathi Maai, Jode Jode Supawa and Patna Ke Ghat Par. Though old, the songs are relevant and devotees play them every year.

"High-handedness of music companies and lack of good lyrics had kept me away all this while," Sharda told The Telegraph on 3 November 2016. "As these issues got addressed this year, I rendered my voice to the songs." It took 20 days to shoot the songs, which were released on Diwali.

The lyricist for Supawo Naa Mile Maai (5.57 minutes) is Hriday Narayan Jha and for Pahile Pahil Chhathi Maiya (6.57 minutes) both Shanti Jain and Sharda. Pahile Pahil... - produced by Neetu Chandra, Nitin Neera Chandra and Anshuman Sinha - has been released under the banners of Swar Sharda (Sharda Sinha Music Foundation), Champaran Talkies and Neo Bihar. Supawo Na Mile Maai has been released under the banner of Swar Sharda and produced by Anshuman.

Sharda's last album on Chhath, Arag, had eight songs. In her entire career, she has sung 62 Chhath songs in nine albums released by T-Series, HMV and Tips.
"Through these songs, I have tried my level best to save our rich culture and tradition," Sharda said. "There is a urban contemporary feel so that people can relate to it."

Sharda has also lent her voice to some Hindi film songs, like Kahe Toh Se Sajna in Maine Pyar Kiya, the movie in which Salman Khan made his debut. There are other songs by her in Hum Aapke Hain Kaun, Anurag Kashyap's critically acclaimed Gangs of Wasseypur (part II), Char Footiya Chokre and Nitin Neera Chandra's Deswa.

References

External links
 

Living people
Hindustani singers
Indian women classical singers
Indian women folk singers
Indian folk singers
Women musicians from Bihar
Singers from Bihar
Recipients of the Padma Shri in arts
People from Supaul district
Women Hindustani musicians
20th-century Indian singers
20th-century Indian women singers
Recipients of the Padma Bhushan in arts
21st-century Indian women singers
21st-century Indian singers
1952 births